Samoana burchi is a species of land snail, a terrestrial gastropod mollusk in the Partulidae family. This species is endemic to Tahiti, French Polynesia.

Distribution
The species occurs in two distinct but rather fragmented montane-forest populations on Mount Aorai and Atara.

References

External links
 

B
Fauna of French Polynesia
Molluscs of Oceania
Critically endangered fauna of Oceania